Ryōgoku Kajinosuke IV (born 30 July 1962 as Hideaki Kobayashi) is a former sumo wrestler from Nagasaki, Japan. His highest rank was komusubi.  He is now a sumo coach under the name of Sakaigawa.

Career
He was a premature baby, who had to be given special care because of his tiny size. He was interested in sumo from a young age, but played soccer until high school as there was no opportunity to practise sumo at his junior high. He was an amateur sumo champion at Nihon University, where he won six major titles. Upon joining the professional sport he had makushita tsukedashi status, allowing him to make his debut at the bottom of the third makushita division. He had a losing score in his first tournament and so his first appearance on the banzuke ranking sheets was actually in the fourth sandanme division. However, he responded with five straight winning records and was promoted to the second jūryō division for the first time in March 1986. After taking part in two playoffs for the jūryō championship in November 1986 and January 1987 he was promoted to the top makuuchi division for the March 1987 tournament. Until this point he had been fighting simply as Kobayashiyama, based on his own surname, but to mark his promotion he was granted the shikona of Ryōgoku, which had previously been used by three previous wrestlers from his Dewanoumi stable, most notably sekiwake Ryōgoku Kajinosuke II, who won the makuuchi division yūshō in 1914 at his first attempt. He was initially known as simply Ryōgoku Hideaki, before switching to the full Ryōgoku Kajinosuke shikona in 1989.

He achieved kachi-koshi in his first two top division tournaments and reached komusubi rank in July 1987. It was to be his highest rank, and he held it on three further occasions. He earned two special prizes for Outstanding Performance and Fighting Spirit. His three kinboshi for defeating yokozuna were all earned against Chiyonofuji. In July 1990 he not only defeated Chiyonofuji but was also the only man to beat the winner of the tournament, Asahifuji. Injury problems in his later career forced Ryōgoku's demotion back down to jūryō a couple of times, and he retired in January 1993.

Retirement from sumo
Ryōgoku remained in the sumo world as an elder of the Japan Sumo Association, under the name Nakadachi Oyakata. He established his own training stable, Nakadachi stable in 1998. In 2003 he switched kabu for the Sakaigawa elder name with former yokozuna Sadanoyama. Therefore the stable was renamed Sakaigawa. Sakaigawa-oyakata is notably part of the Japan Sumo Association board of directors (riji).
Ryōgoku successfully transitioned as a trainer, his  stable producing a lot of talented rikishi, with seven sekitori as of 2011. His first top division wrestler was Iwakiyama in 2002, a former amateur champion, followed by Hochiyama in 2006. In 2014 his most senior wrestler Gōeidō reached ōzeki rank and won a tournament championship in 2016.

Career record

See also
List of sumo elders
List of sumo tournament second division champions
Glossary of sumo terms
List of past sumo wrestlers
List of komusubi

References

External links
Tournament results

1962 births
Living people
Japanese sumo wrestlers
Sumo people from Nagasaki Prefecture
Komusubi
Nihon University alumni